Komi Massamasso Tchangai (8 August 1978 – 8 August 2010) was a Togolese professional footballer who played as a defender.

Club career
Tchangai signed to the Italian club Udinese Calcio in 1998 after appearing for Togo at the 1998 African Cup of Nations finals in Burkina Faso. Tchangai was loaned to ND Gorica in Slovenia and later to the Dutch club De Graafschap before moving to Viterbese and Benevento in the Italian lower leagues. He signed for Saudi club Al-Nasr on 17 November 2009, making him one of the club's biggest signings in recent history.

International career
Tchangai was a member of the Togo national team and was called up to the 2006 World Cup. He represented his country at four Africa Cup of Nations (1998, 2000, 2002, 2006). He earned his first national cap for Togo against Congo in August 1996. He won 37 caps and scored five goals for Togo.

Death
Tchangai died on the evening of his 32nd birthday, on 8 August 2010, after a brief illness.

References

External links
 

1978 births
2010 deaths
Togolese footballers
Togo international footballers
2006 FIFA World Cup players
1998 African Cup of Nations players
2000 African Cup of Nations players
2002 African Cup of Nations players
2006 Africa Cup of Nations players
Association football defenders
Tunisian Ligue Professionnelle 1 players
Slovenian PrvaLiga players
Eredivisie players
Serie C players
Chinese Super League players
Saudi Professional League players
ASKO Kara players
CA Bizertin players
ND Gorica players
Udinese Calcio players
U.S. Viterbese 1908 players
Benevento Calcio players
De Graafschap players
Al Nassr FC players
Shenzhen F.C. players
Togolese expatriate footballers
Togolese expatriate sportspeople in Tunisia
Expatriate footballers in Tunisia
Togolese expatriate sportspeople in Slovenia
Expatriate footballers in Slovenia
Togolese expatriate sportspeople in Italy
Expatriate footballers in Italy
Togolese expatriate sportspeople in the Netherlands
Expatriate footballers in the Netherlands
Togolese expatriate sportspeople in Saudi Arabia
Expatriate footballers in Saudi Arabia
Expatriate footballers in China
21st-century Togolese people